Czapek medium, also called Czapek's agar (CZA) or Czapek-Dox medium, is a growth medium for propagating fungi and other organisms in a laboratory. It was named after its inventors, Czech botanist Friedrich Johann Franz Czapek (May 16, 1868 – July 31, 1921) and American chemist Arthur Wayland Dox (September 19, 1882 – 1954). It was developed to grow Aspergillus niger and Penicillium camemberti.  It works well for many saprophytic fungi and soil bacteria such as species of Aspergillus, Candida, Penicillium, and Paecilomyces.

Friedrich Czapek's original recipe is as follows:

1000 g distilled water
30 g cane sugar – energy source and sole source of carbon
1 g dipotassium phosphate – buffering agent
0.5 g magnesium sulfate – source of cations
0.5 g potassium chloride – source of essential ions
0.01 g iron sulfate – source of cations

Arthur Wayland Dox added 2 g of sodium nitrate in his version, to provide a sole source of nitrogen that is inorganic.  This makes the medium a selective growth medium as only organisms that can use inorganic nitrogen can grow.  Czapek and Dox did not add agar but many recipes add 15 g to make a solid medium.

References

External links 
Czapek Medium recipe
Czapek solution agar recipe
Czapek's Agar recipe
Czapek-Dox Agar

Microbiological media
Cell culture media